Pocklington Reef is a coral reef and a mostly submerged atoll in the far southeast of Papua New Guinea.

It is 162.4 km from the closest island, Loa Boloba, which is a tiny coral islet within the fringing reef near Cape Deliverance, the south east point of Rossel Island (Yela) in the Louisiade Archipelago, and belongs to Milne Bay province, Samarai-Murua District, Yaleyamba Rural Local Level Government Area.

Pocklington Reef sits on top of Pocklington Ridge, which extends north-east from Rossel Island. The reef is 32 km long and up to 4 km wide. Its longer axis is north-east-south-west. The rim of the reef encloses a deep lagoon. The northern rim reaches closer to the surface, and several above water rocks with heights between 0.9 and 3 metres high lie along its length. There is a small spit of sand about the size of a football field (less than one hectare) at the north-east end.

It is isolated from other reef systems by deep water and relatively pristine.

Before Papua New Guinea achieved sovereignty in 1975 it was decided Pocklington Reef should be part of the new nation.

History 
The reef was discovered and named by the captain of the Sydney whaler Pocklington in 1825.

A number of vessels have been wrecked on the atoll. The brig Reindeer (324 tons) was on the way from Melbourne to China for a cargo of tea when she was wrecked here in September 1855. Among the crewmen aboard was Walter Powell. 

The Earl of Hardwick (280 tons) was on the way from Newcastle, New South Wales, with a cargo of coal to Hong Kong in 1862 when it was wrecked on 10 June. 

The Genevieve (1,000 tons) was a relatively new vessel built at Quebec in 1870 and sailing from Melbourne to Manilla when she came to grief in September 1874. Captain Largie, of the Woodlark, ship, bound from Brisbane to Hong Kong: reported sighted a vessel ashore at the south-west end of the Pocklington Reef. She had nothing standing but the mizzen mast and bowsprit, and evidently had been on the reef some time

HMS Renard under the command of Lieutenant G.E. Richards surveyed the reef in 1880 and noted there was no anchorage around its perimeter.

On 28 April 1962, the Panamanian vessel SS Dona Ourania (8,716 tons) grounded on Pocklington Reef.

The Japanese ship Amigi Maru (280 ft, 2,249 tons) ran aground during a cyclone in May 1972. It could not be saved and had to be abandoned.

In April 1974 the soviet vessel Fedor Litke spent a week at a sandbank on the reef. An Australian naval vessel visited the site soon after and it was reported a concealed electronic monitoring device was found there.

Illegal drugs worth $30 million were hidden in a wreck on the reef in 1978. Stored in watertight bags, the cannabis had been left by a trawler from Thailand.

Fishing
A Taiwanese fishing vessel was detected illegally fishing off the reef in October 1979 within PNG’s 200-mile fishing zone. The skipper was fined 1000 kina and the vessel’s fishing gear was seized.

Sports fishing takes place off Pocklington Reef.

Marine protected area 
Pocklington Reef Marine Park is a proposed marine protected area.

References

External links

Maritime boundaries
Papua New Guinea Act

Coral reefs
Islands of Milne Bay Province
Louisiade Archipelago
Reefs of Papua New Guinea